One hundred twenty-two Guggenheim Fellowships were awarded in 1947.

1947 U.S. and Canadian Fellows

1947 Latin American and Caribbean Fellows

See also
 Guggenheim Fellowship
 List of Guggenheim Fellowships awarded in 1946
 List of Guggenheim Fellowships awarded in 1948

References

1947
1947 awards